The 2012 Virginia Cavaliers men's soccer team represented the University of Virginia during the 2012 NCAA Division I men's soccer season. It was the program's 72nd season of existence, their 72nd in NCAA Division I, and their 59th season of playing in the Atlantic Coast Conference.

Background 

The Cavaliers entered the 2012 season after a first round exit from the 2011 NCAA Division I Men's Soccer Championship for a second straight year, as well as a defeat in the semifinals of the 2011 ACC Men's Soccer Tournament. It was the second straight season of failing to win any conference or NCAA soccer tournament since their triumph in 2009.

Competitions

Preseason

Regular season

ACC Standings

Match results

ACC Tournament

NCAA Tournament

References 

Virginia Cavaliers
Virginia Cavaliers men's soccer seasons
Cavaliers
Virginia Cavaliers